Voyer may refer to:

People
 Bernard Voyer (born 1953), Canadian explorer and mountaineer
 Jean-Pierre Voyer (born 1938), French philosopher
 Joachim Ulric Voyer (1892-1935), Canadian composer
 Marc Antoine René de Voyer, (1722–1787), French ambassador

Places
 Voyer, Moselle, Grand Est, France